Ashley Berggren was part of the United States National Team that captured the gold medal at the 2013 IFAF Women's World Football Championships. Her club team is the Chicago Force. of the Women's Football Alliance Prior to her career in football, Berggren was a member of the Chicago Condors of the American Basketball League (ABL).

Athletic career

Basketball
Having competed at Barrington High School, she would play collegiate basketball for the Illinois Fighting Illini women's basketball program. With Illinois, she helped the squad to its first-ever Big Ten Conference Title, while earning three straight All-Big Ten honors (1996 to 1998). Her 2,061 career points after fifteen years is still good enough for second all-time. She was also the first women's basketball player to have her jersey retired by Illinois.

Before she would join the ranks of professional women's football, Berggren was the second round pick of the Chicago Condors in the 1999 ABL Draft. She was one of five players on the roster that had connections to Chicago and was even immortalized on a trading card.

Illinois statistics

Source

Football
At the 2013 IFAF Women's Worlds, Berggren would log one touchdown in a contest versus Sweden, while ranking sixth on the US in receiving yards. In the gold medal game versus Canada, she would compile three receptions for 34 yards. Also in 2013, she would help the Force win their first-ever WFA national championship.

In the national championship versus the Dallas Diamonds (of which several Dallas players were her teammates with Team USA), Berggren would catch a 20-yard touchdown pass from Sami Grisafe to give the Force a 26–0 advantage at halftime.

Of note, she also had the opportunity to compete in the 2012 WFA National Championship game. Contested at Heinz Field in Pittsburgh, it was the first women's football game ever held in an NFL stadium.

Coaching career
Berggren was a 2013 inductee into the Illinois Basketball Coaches Association Hall of Fame.  Having served as the bench boss for the Schaumburg girls basketball coach for four seasons (leading them to back-to-back winning seasons), she did not return for the 2013–14 season as her teaching position was no longer available.

Awards and honors
Big Ten Women's Basketball Player of the Year (1997)
NCAA Women's Basketball First-Team All-American (1997)

References

1976 births
Living people
All-American college women's basketball players
American women's basketball players
Basketball players from Illinois
Illinois Fighting Illini women's basketball players